The 1953 Coupe de France Final was a football match held at Stade Olympique Yves-du-Manoir, Colombes on May 31, 1953, that saw Lille OSC defeat FC Nancy 2–1 thanks to goals by Jean Vincent and Bernard Lefèvre.

Match details

See also
Coupe de France 1952-1953

External links
Coupe de France results at Rec.Sport.Soccer Statistics Foundation
Report on French federation site

Coupe
1953
Coupe De France Final 1953
Sport in Hauts-de-Seine
Coupe de France Final
Coupe de France Final